Christopher Bermudez is an American professional soccer player who plays as a midfielder for Chattanooga FC in the National Independent Soccer Association (NISA).

Early life
Christopher Bermudez is from Union City, New Jersey.

Career
He was part of the youth academy at New York Red Bulls from 2015 to 2017 and played at Union City High School. He then joined the youth set-up of Mexican Liga MX club Pachuca for two years before signing a professional contract with USL League One side Greenville Triumph.

Bermudez made his competitive debut for Greenville Triumph on March 29, 2019, in their opening League One match against Tormenta. He played 81-minutes as Greenville were defeated 1–0. He then scored his first professional goal on August 28 in a league match against Forward Madison. His 42nd-minute goal was the only goal in a 1–0 victory for Greenville Triumph. Bermudez then scored the lone goal in Greenville Triumph's 1–0 victory over Lansing Ignite, leading the club to the 2019 USL League One Championship.

On January 16, 2020, Bermudez moved to Real Monarchs in the USL Championship. His option was declined by Real Monarchs following the 2020 season.

In 2021, Bermudez signed with National Independent Soccer Association side New Amsterdam FC. He made his first appearance on May 14 as a second-half substitute against Stumptown AC. He scored his first goal with the team on June 16 against San Diego 1904 FC in a 4–1 win (New Amsterdam's first as a professional team).

Bermudez signed with Chattanooga FC on April 29, 2022.

Career statistics

References

External links 
 USL League One Profile
 NISA Profile

1999 births
Living people
American sportspeople of Colombian descent
Sportspeople from Union City, New Jersey
American soccer players
New York Red Bulls players
C.F. Pachuca players
Greenville Triumph SC players
Real Monarchs players
New Amsterdam FC players
Association football midfielders
Soccer players from New Jersey
USL League One players
National Independent Soccer Association players
Chattanooga FC players